The Alakit is a river in Yakutia (Sakha Republic), Russia.

The river flows across a lonely, desolate area of Mirninsky and Olenyoksky districts. Currently there are no settlements, but a small village named Alakit was located by the river in its upper course, a little upstream of the mouth of the Yuyose-Delingde, a left tributary.

The Daldyn-Alakit kimberlite field is located between the upper Alakit in the west and the Daldyn River by Udachnaya in the east.

Course
The Alakit is a right tributary of the Olenyok. It originates in a small lake of the northeastern side of the Central Siberian Plateau. The river flows roughly northwestwards or northwards all along its course. In some stretches it forms meanders and there are lakes near its channel in certain sections of its course. Finally it meets the right bank of the Olenyok  from its mouth.

The river is fed by rain and snow. Owing to the severe climate of the plateau it is frozen between early October and late May.

See also
List of rivers of Russia

References

External links 
Fishing & Tourism in Yakutia
Chromium from Udachnaya-Vostochnaya pipe, Daldyn, Daldyn-Alakit kimberlite field, Saha Republic (Sakha Republic; Yakutia), Eastern-Siberian Region, Russia

Rivers of the Sakha Republic
Central Siberian Plateau
Tributaries of the Olenyok